The South American lungfish (Lepidosiren paradoxa) is the single species of lungfish found in swamps and slow-moving waters of the Amazon, Paraguay, and lower Paraná River basins in South America. Notable as an obligate air-breather, it is the sole member of its family Lepidosirenidae. Relatively little is known about the South American lungfish. Additional common names include American mud-fish  and scaly salamanderfish. The South American Lungfish have adapted to cope with both droughts and floods. This is normal due to the South American Lungfish adapting pulmonary mechanoreceptors.

The immature lungfish is spotted with gold on a black background; in the adult, this fades to a brown or gray color. Its tooth-bearing premaxillary and maxillary bones are fused as in all Dipnoi. South American lungfish also share an autostylic jaw suspension (where the palatoquadrate is fused to the cranium) and powerful adductor jaw muscles with the other extant Dipnoi. Like the African lungfishes, this species has an elongated, almost eel-like body. The pectoral fins are thin and thread-like, while the pelvic fins are somewhat larger, and set far back. The fins are connected to the shoulder by a single bone, which is a marked difference from most fish, whose fins usually have at least four bones at their base, and a marked similarity with nearly all land-dwelling vertebrates. The gills are greatly reduced and essentially non-functional in the adults.

Juvenile lungfish feed on insect larvae and snails, while adults are omnivorous, adding algae and shrimp to their diets, crushing them with their heavily mineralized tooth-plates. The fish's usual habitats disappear during the dry season, so they burrow into the mud and make a chamber about  down, leaving a few holes to the surface for air. During this aestivation, they produce a layer of mucus to seal in moisture, and slow their metabolism down greatly.

When the rainy season begins, they come out and begin to mate. The parents build a nest for the young, which resemble tadpoles and have four external gills. To enrich the oxygen in the nest, the male develops highly vascularized structures on his pelvic fins that release additional oxygen into the water. The young become air-breathing at about seven weeks. Juveniles have external threadlike gills very much like those of newts.
Fossils of the modern species have been found between 72 and 66 mya during the Maastrichtian stage of the late Cretaceous just before the KPG extinction that killed off the non-avian dinosaurs.

References

External links

Lungfish
Taxa named by Leopold Fitzinger
Fish described in 1837
Freshwater fish of Colombia
Freshwater fish of Venezuela
Fish of French Guiana
Freshwater fish of Brazil
Freshwater fish of Peru
Fish of Bolivia
Fish of Paraguay
Freshwater fish of Argentina